The Ballad of the Salty Sea is a graphic novel, the first episode of the adventures of Corto Maltese, a Maltese sailor. This story was written and drawn by the Italian comic book creator Hugo Pratt. It was published for the first time between 1967 and 1969, in the magazine Il Sergente Kirk. It takes place in Melanesia (Western Oceania), shortly before World War I, between 1913 and 1915. It introduces many future important characters from the series, such as the romantic Corto, the crazy Russian sailor Rasputin, and the young cousins Pandora and Cain.

Overview

October 31, 1913, Halloween (called "Tarowean Day" in this story): the Pacific Ocean is calm after a terrible storm. Rasputin, a Russian pirate, sails aboard a Fijian catamaran, when his second Cranio spots two young unconscious castaways in a lifeboat, off Bougainville Island (Solomon Islands). They are brought on board, Rasputin hoping to obtain a ransom from their family. After waking up, they explain that they are two cousins, Pandora and Cain Groovesnore. They were sailing aboard their yacht when it burned down, leaving them as the only survivors. Their family, Groovesnore, of Sydney (Australia), is an important dynasty at the head of the South Seas.

A few later, under a beating sun, the crew this time sees a man tied to a raft: it is the Maltese pirate Corto Maltese. The latter has endured this torture since the day before. Because he refused to marry a young woman when he had to, his crew mutinied against him and punished him in this way. The Russian, with whom he is an accomplice, agrees to take him on board, after making fun of him. Together, they discuss their project to accomplish their mission, in the service of the "Monk", a mysterious pirate ruling the Pacific Ocean, whose identity is unknown.

Their mission is to loot coal ships of various nationalities on behalf of the German Empire, as World War I approaches. Thus, they attack a Dutch cargo ship near Malaita and board a member of his crew, a young Maori sailor called Tarao.

Later, all of them sail together around Melanesians islands. At first, they go to Kaiserine (a German possession in New Guinea). There, the pirates discreetly meet their customer, Admiral Von Speeke. While Rasputin deals with the Germans, Corto keeps the catamaran on the Ottilien-Fluss (Ramu River), with the cousins, who are prisoners, and the crew. Then, they are victims of a storm and sink near the Sepik River.

Corto and Pandora, who survive, hide in a cave. A dispute began between them: in rage, she shoots him, making him unconscious. Then, they are taken prisoner, with Tarao and Cain, by cannibal Seniks (Papuans). Then, the Fijian Cranio succeeds in freeing everyone and they board a boat.

Finally, they are saved near the New Britain (Bismarck Archipelago) by the German soldier Christian Slütter, in his submarine. Inside, they meet Rasputin and a Japanese sailor, nicknamed Taki Jap. Together, they set a course for the hidden island of Escondida, the Monk's lair. The latter could be very old, trafficking for over one or two centuries. At the same time, several people have become attached to each other, in particular towards Pandora, like Corto or Slütter.

On the spot, the Monk announces to his henchmen news dating from August 4, 1914: England declares war on Germany. Therefore, they themselves are also at war. So he prepares plans for the future. Also, he hears about Pandora and Cain and seems curiously interested in them. In fact, he wants to protect them and questions them a lot about their family. Likewise, he orders Rasputin to be responsible for their safety, over his life. Recently, Pandora was the victim of an accident and became unconscious. Thus, the Monk meets her and, seeing her asleep, strangely enters a crisis of dementia. He feels sad and alone: Maltese tries to support him.

Then, he decides to advance his departure, leaving with Slütter and Corto, whom he considers his only friend. But by a new act of madness, he pushes him from the top of a cliff, before leaving without him, believing him dead. At the same time, Cranio is responsible for the management of the island during his absence and must closely monitor Rasputin.

The Fijian talks to Pandora and reveals that Corto survived his fall and is hiding in a shelter. Likewise, he reveals to her what he knows about the Monk. This mysterious figure is a former Protestant pastor, replacing another monk who once ruled this island. The latter trafficked in slaves (which earned him his excommunication), until he became ill with leprosy. When he died, he was replaced by the current monk. And the natives relatively accept being led by him. Indeed, they are freer than other natives of Oceania, who are colonized.

Later, a conflict breaks out between Rasputin and Cranio and the former kills the latter. Meanwhile, Pandora embarks in an outrigger boat with Tarao, who uses his seafaring skills to seek help. Guided by the shark Mao, they arrive at Bura Nea island (Admiralty Islands), where they meet New Zealand soldiers.

Gradually, the conflicts of the First World War begin. The Australians and the Japanese discover the plans of the Germans. Rinald Groovesnore, Royal Australian Navy Officer and cousins' uncle, was notified and arrived on Bura Nea. Thanks to Tarao and Pandora, he discovers Escondida. The Monk, informed by Corto of the departure of the two young people, supposes that his lair will be found. He then deserts the island by a submarine with Taki Jap. But, just before, for mysterious reasons, he tries vainly to kill Slütter.

When Rinald Groovesnore arrives, everyone is arrested except the two fugitives, who were able to leave in time. Pandora and Cain testify positively in favor of Corto, who is thus pardoned. But Slütter is condemned by Rinald Groovesnore to be executed and attempts from the cousins to save him are useless.

Rummaging through Slütter's belongings, Cain and Tarao discover a letter he addresses to Corto. He reveals a capital secret that could have saved him. He explains the identity and the secrets of the Monk, whom he learned during a delirium from this mysterious man. He is actually Thomas Groovesnore, Rinald's brother and Cain's uncle. In the past, he passionately loved a woman named Margretha, who was his lover. But she eventually married his brother Tadee. During the ceremony, desperate, the man torched the house where the lovers had spent time and made believe in his death. Only she was expecting a baby from him; she claimed it came from her husband. This baby was Pandora. This is why the Monk was protective of the cousins and went mad when he saw Pandora. Seeing in his daughter the face of the woman who was the ambition of his life, he was tortured by his painful past. And that's why he wanted to kill Slütter, so that he wouldn't reveal his secrets.

Affected by the execution of his friend Slütter, Corto tries to blackmail Rinald Groovesnore with the letter to avenge him. To create trouble for the Officer, he forced him to release Rasputin, also sentenced to death. The latter will be grateful to Maltese, admitting to having a deep friendship, despite the hatred he seems to carry.

January 1915: the time for farewell comes. Corto greets Cain and Pandora, leaving aboard a destroyer. They are now his friends, just like Tarao. The latter embarks with Corto Maltese, who goes away in his ketch, in the company of Rasputin. Together, they will cross the Pacific for new tribulations.

Characters
This episode features many characters, some of whom will reappear or be mentioned in later episodes:
Cranio: Fijian sailor, who worked when he was young with a lawyer in Viti Levu (the largest island in the Republic of Fiji). This Rasputin's crew master has the Monk's confidence. He regrets seeing his people involved in the wars of the Whites people and aspires that the Melanesians finally unite. This would establish a Melanesian homeland, a similar claim among Polynesians.
Rasputin: Russian pirate crisscrossing the Pacific on behalf of the Monk. He is greedy, ruthless, violent and fond of murder. He does not hesitate to assassinate people who get in his way. He often promises Corto to kill him one day. But deep down, he feels affection and shows loyalty to him, whom he considers his only friend. Thereafter, he will reappear in many other episodes of the series, being Maltese's best friend / enemy.
Pandora and Cain Groovesnore: Main characters of this story, they come from the family dynasty ruling the South Seas, the Groovesnore, based on Sidney. Rinald Groovesnore, the vice admiral who commands the Royal Australian Navy fleet, is their uncle. Cain is British and Pandora is American. Their personality and their relationships with the other characters will evolve throughout the story. Hating Corto at first, he will become his friend, while she will have sentiments for him. Thereafter, Cain will return in the story Burlesque Between Zuydcoote and Bray-Dunes (in the volume Celtic Tales). While Pandora will only be mentioned and will only reappear in Corto's dreams (for example in The Golden House of Samarkand). Pandora Groovesnore owes its name to Pratt's acquaintance, the Australian Pandora Grosvenor, a ship-owner's daughter.
Corto Maltese: Born in Malta, this sailor has traveled around the world. Due to various circumstances, he became a pirate, then began to work for the Monk with his friend Rasputin. Romantic, elegant and ironic, he is quick off the mark. Throughout history, he has had feelings for Pandora. Then, he will remain haunted over the years by this ancient love.
Tarao: He is a New Zealand Maori who was spared by Rasputin during the attack on the cargo ship, to enter his service. Young experienced sailor, he knows how to take advantage of the beliefs and legends of the peoples of the South Pacific. In his village, he was educated by a certain Miss Star, who runs his school with his father, the chief. Then he worked on a Dutch cargo ship to learn a job, where he was captured. Thereafter, he will keep company with Cain, Pandora and Corto.
Christian Slütter: Lieutenant of the Kaiserliche Marine, the Imperial German Navy, he reluctantly received orders from his superiors to take command of a submarine to place himself at the disposal of the Monk.
The Monk: A pirate leader, he constantly wears a cowl and hides his face and his identity under a hood. From his island, Escondida, he heads a secret organization that rules the South Seas. He put himself at the service of Germany to procure coal for its boats crossing the region. No one knows its identity and some claim that it has existed for over two hundred years.
Toko, aka "Taki Jap": Japanese military, captain of a gunboat.

The first Corto Maltese's appearance
Although the story introduces a new comic book character destined to become famous, Corto Maltese is not the main character.  According to Pratt, Pandora Groovesnore is the central character. He explains that everyone is in love with her, and that she is a kind and beautiful girl who becomes an adult. Corto is just a secondary character, like so many others in this story. The cartoonist did not suspect that he would reuse the Corto Maltese character for a whole series.

To pretend that this story is true, Pratt published, in addition, a fake letter from Cain's nephew, Obregan Carrenza, which he had to give to the cartoonist himself. This process is also often used in adventure novels. This document, dating from the middle of the 20th century évokes Corto's old age and his sadness following the death of his friend Tarao. This letter is missing from many editions of this story, probably because some publishers refuse to let the reader imagine the aging hero.

Sequel and prequel
Hugo Pratt will reuse Corto Maltese for news adventures taking place in America, published for the first time in 1970 and collected in the volume Under the Sign of Capricorn. This is the start of his Corto Maltese series, comprising twelve episodes. One of which takes place eight years before the first episode, in 1905 in Manchuria (China), relating the meeting between Corto and Rasputin: Corto Maltese: The Early Years. After Pratt's death, the series was resumed by Ruben Pellejero and Juan Diaz Canales. They have currently made three additional episodes. In the last one, they imagined a prequel to The Ballad of the Salty Sea, All Saints Day, to explain why Corto was attached to the raft and how he worked for the Monk.

Analysis

The island of Escondida

Escondida is a fictional island located in Western Oceania, the scene of an important part of this story. Its coordinates are 169 ° west longitude, 19 ° south latitude. Which corresponds to the location of the Tanna Island (in Vanuatu, near New Caledonia). However, Pratt claimed that his model was Abaiang (Gilbert Islands, Kiribati).

Literary references
The story abounds in literary references. For example, at the start, Rasputin is reading Voyage autour du monde, Louis Antoine de Bougainville's travel diary. This French explorer indeed sailed in the same zone where he was at that time. Cain, on several occasions, spreads his culture through various allusions. Thus, when he failed on a beach with Tarao, he compares themself to Robinson Crusoe and Friday (characters created by Daniel Defoe). Then, when they escape from the cannibals with the others, he tells him about Moby Dick (from the novel Moby-Dick by Herman Melville). Later, in Slütter's submarine, he is reading "The Rime of the Ancient Mariner", the long poem by Samuel Taylor Coleridge. Finally, when he leaves Escondida with Pandora, he evokes the ship Argo and the character Jason, from Greek mythology.

Inspirations
Twenty years after the creation of this story, Pratt slipped a dedication into it. It pays homage to the Irish writer Henry De Vere Stacpoole, who piqued Pratt's interest in the South Seas.

Oceanian cultural elements
Hugo Pratt discreetly slides into his story various allusions to cultural elements of the different Oceanian peoples encountered, whether through their songs or their conversations. They allude for example to gods, creatures or illustrious people, like Kanaloa, Tāne, Tū, Rongo, Tangaroa, Māui, Kupe, Pehee Nuee Nuee. They also speak of mythical places like Hawaiki. Finally, they evoke several of the many Pacific islands: Mangareva, Hawaii, Tahiti, Heragi (Māori name for Pitcairn Island, in Pitcairn Islands), Aotearoa (Māori name for New Zealand), Tubuai. The decor of the comic is punctuated by various Oceanian masks. Several of them are thus visible on the house where Cain is a prisoner. These items resemble those made by Baining people, they live in Papua New Guinea.

Despite this realism, Pratt allows himself touches of fantasy, sometimes making his Oceanian characters speak in Venetian language (an element that translators leave as is).

Awards and tributes

Awards
The album won the award for the best foreign realistic work at the 1976 Angoulême Festival.

Ranking
This story was classified in 2012 at the 3rd place of the classification of "50 essential BD" established by the Frenc magazine LIRE

Preface
Umberto Eco, Italian novelist and literary critic, made a preface to this story (found in the 1989 edition) on the geographic and cultural references of this story.

Notes and references

Notes

References

Bibliography 
 
 
 

Comics set in Melanesia
Comics set during World War I
Corto Maltese